Geraldine Weber Moreno is an Ecuadorian politician. She is a member of the National assembly representing Guaya. She is a member of the Social Christian Party (PSC)

Political career
She is opposed to the legalisation of abortion in Ecuador even where it results from a rape.

In June 2021 she one of the people calling for action about the "terrorism" in Guayaquil and other cities.

Private life
Weber married the same man when she was 19 and when she was 39. The second marriage followed five years apart after a divorce. They found the reconciliation difficult and they gave talks on how to resolve marital differences after they were happy again.

References 

Living people
Members of the National Assembly (Ecuador)
21st-century Ecuadorian politicians
21st-century Ecuadorian women politicians
Women members of the National Assembly (Ecuador)
Year of birth missing (living people)